Nikolay Mordvinov may refer to:

 Nikolay Mordvinov (admiral) (1754–1845), Russian admiral
 Nikolay Mordvinov (actor) (1901–1966), Russian actor